The Ministry of Tourism is part of the Maldivian Executive branch responsible to develop the Maldivian tourism industry. The tourism ministry monitors the tourism sector and regulates it. The tourism ministry was introduced in 1965 shortly after the independence of Maldives.

List of Ministers

See also
 Maldives
 Ministry of Home Affairs (Maldives)
 Economy of the Maldives

References

Politics of the Maldives
Political organisations based in the Maldives
Tourism in the Maldives
1965 establishments in the Maldives